Giusto Pellanera (or Corrado Pellanera, born 12 March 1938) is a retired Italian basketball player. He won a gold medal at the 1963 Mediterranean Games and finished fifth and eighth at the 1964 and 1968 Olympics, respectively. His team placed fourth at EuroBasket 1965.

References

1938 births
Living people
Olympic basketball players of Italy
Basketball players at the 1964 Summer Olympics
Basketball players at the 1968 Summer Olympics
Mediterranean Games gold medalists for Italy
Competitors at the 1963 Mediterranean Games
Mediterranean Games medalists in basketball
Italian men's basketball players
1963 FIBA World Championship players
1967 FIBA World Championship players